Pachygronthidae is a family of true bugs in the order Hemiptera. There are about 14 genera and more than 80 described species in Pachygronthidae.

Genera
These 14 genera belong to the family Pachygronthidae:

 Cymophyes Fieber, 1870
 Darwinocoris Slater, 1962
 Magninus Distant, 1901
 Oedancala Amyot & Serville, 1843
 Opistostenus Reuter, 1882
 Pachygrontha Germar, 1837
 Pachyphlegyas Slater, 1955
 Paristhmius Reuter, 1887
 Phlegyas Stal, 1865
 Stenophlegyas Slater, 1956
 Stenophyella Horvath, 1914
 Teracrius Stal, 1858
 Uttaris Stal, 1874
 † Procymophyes Sailer & Carvalho, 1957

References

Further reading

External links

 

Lygaeoidea
Heteroptera families
Articles created by Qbugbot